Olga Linek Scholl (also known as Olga Linek Russ) was a Czech-American screenwriter who worked in Hollywood during the silent era.

Biography 
Olga was born in Austria-Hungary to Edward Linek and Laura Jansig; the family moved to New York City when she was young. She married Russia-born portrait painter Edward Scholl. The pair had a daughter together. After moving to Los Angeles and writing for film during the medium's early years, she transitioned into writing for the radio in the 1930s.

Selected films 
 The Net (1923)
 Man-Woman-Marriage (1921)
 Once to Every Woman (1920) 
 The Right to Happiness (1919)
 The Heart of Humanity (1918)

References 

Austro-Hungarian emigrants to the United States
American women screenwriters
Czech screenwriters
1884 births
1982 deaths
20th-century American women writers
20th-century American screenwriters